

Seeds
  Sanchai Ratiwatana /  Sonchat Ratiwatana
 Treat Conrad Huey /  Cecil Mamiit

Draw

Men's doubles